In the theatre of ancient Greece, the skene was the structure at the back of a stage. The word  means 'tent' or 'hut', and it is thought that the original structure for these purposes was a tent or light building of wood and was a temporary structure. It was initially a very light structure or just cloth hanging from a rope, but over the course of time the skene underwent fundamental changes.

During the Roman Period, the  had become a large and complex, elaborately decorated, stone building on several levels. Actors emerged from the parodoi and could use its steps and balconies to speak from.  It was also where costumes were stored and to which the periaktoi (painted panels serving as the background) were connected.

Classical Greece 
Ancient Greek theatre began in the 6th century BC and traces its origins to religious rituals such as the Festival of Dionysus and choral odes to the gods known as dithyrambs. Early Greek theatres were simple open air structures built on the slope of a hill. The Theatre of Dionysus in Athens is thought to have been the first purpose-built theatre. Around the middle of the 5th century BC, the  began to appear in Greek theatre. Placing a  behind the orchestra – where the performers acted, played, and danced – broke what is thought to have been the original theatre in the round nature of Greek theatre. The  also served as another "hidden stage". At times some of the action went on inside, in which case it was up to the audience to decide what was happening based on the noises coming from the inside.

At some point at Athens in the Classical period a small stoa colonnade was constructed behind the scene-building with its back to the theatre and would have provided a permanent backdrop for the action."

Hellenistic period 
The Hellenistic period started around the time of Alexander the Great's death in 323 BC and lasted until the Roman Victory at the Battle of Actium in 31 BC. As Ancient Greece began to change from a culture consisting of ethnic and city-state Greeks to one governed by large monarchies, theatre architecture to include the stage buildings began to experience significant changes. In the 4th century BC, the  became a permanent stone structure and the stage was raised off the ground.

This important change occurred in the Hellenistic period, between the 3rd and 1st centuries BC. The  itself became increasingly elaborate, and was also available as a place for actors to declaim from, so that the performers between them had three levels available. Most theatres still standing today date from the Hellenistic period.

Roman period 
In Roman theatres, scaenae frons ('facade of the ') is the term for the elaborately decorated stone screens, rising two or three stories, that the  had now become. The evolution of the actor, who assumed an individual part and answered to the chorus (the word for actor, means 'answerer'), introduced into drama a new form, the alternation of acted scenes, or episodes. The  no longer supported painted sets in the Greek manner, but relied for effect on elaborate permanent architectural decoration and consisted of a series of complex stone buildings.

Surviving examples

Notes

References
 Boardman, John ed., The Oxford History of Classical Art, 1993, OUP, .
 "Grove" = Anastasia N. Dinsmoor, William B. Dinsmoor jr, "Architecture; Theatres" section in Thomas Braun, et al. "Greece, ancient". Grove Art Online, Oxford Art Online, Oxford University Press. Web. 22 Mar. 2016.
 "Perseus", Perseus Encyclopedia, Skene.

External links

 Ancient Roman Theatre - http://www.crystalinks.com/rometheaters.html

Ancient Greek theatre
Parts of a theatre
History of theatre
Greek words and phrases